The Waipekakoura River is a river of the Northland Region of New Zealand's North Island. It flows east to reach the Kerikeri River five kilometres west of Kerikeri.

See also
List of rivers of New Zealand

References

Far North District
Rivers of the Northland Region
Rivers of New Zealand